Björn Bjerke (1941–2018) was a Swedish economist, professor in entrepreneurship and small firms at Stockholm University, known for the 1997 book "Methodology for Creating Business Knowledge" written with Ingeman Arbnor.

Bjerke received his PhD from the Lund University, where he kept working for some years. Later he held professorships at the Waikato University in New Zealand, the King Fahd University of Petroleum and Minerals in Saudi Arabia, University of Maiduguri in Nigeria and the University of Southern California. He was also Senior Fellow at the National University of Singapore in Singapore. Back in Sweden in the new millennium Bjerke was working at the Malmö University College before going to Stockholm. At Stockholm University Bjerke led a research group in entrepreneurship consisting of 15 junior researchers. From 2007 to 2011 he has been working at the Baltic Business School at the Linnaeus University in Kalmar, Sweden. Bjarke, coined the term "public entrepreneurship" attempting to describe the non-profit orientated standard, associated with subjects of the higher-stage-socialist welfare, operating with relative autonomy under a dominating state enterprise.

Bjerke's research interests "centre around methodologies in order to study entrepreneurship, the role of marketing in successful entrepreneurships and successful regions of growth and entrepreneurship’s role in this connection".

Publications 
Books, a selection:
 1974. Problemformulering och systemanalys: Introduktion till utredningsmetodik med exempel
 1975. Produktionsekonomi with Rolf Andersson and Bengt O. Färnström.
 1981. Some comments on methodology in management research
 1994. Företagsekonomisk metodlära with Ingeman Arbnor
 1997. Methodology for Creating Business Knowledge. With Ingeman Arbnor. California : Sage Publications. (Third Edition 2009).
 1999. Facing Business. Krieger Publishing Company.
 2000. Business Leadership and Culture. National Management Styles in the Global economy. Edward Elgar. UK/US.
 2002. Entrepreneurial marketing : the growth of small firms in the new economic era. Cheltenham: Edward Elgar.
 2007. Understanding Entrepreneurship
 2011. Entrepreneurial Imagination : Time, Timing, Space and Place in Business Action with Hans Rämö. Edward Elgar. UK/US.
 2013. Social Entrepreneurship: To act as if and make a difference. With Mathias Karlsson. Edward Elgar. UK/US.

References 

1941 births
Living people
Swedish business theorists
Swedish economists
Academic staff of Stockholm University
Lund University alumni
Academic staff of Lund University
Academic staff of King Fahd University of Petroleum and Minerals
Academic staff of the University of Waikato
University of Southern California faculty
Academic staff of Malmö University